Acrospelion is a genus of flowering plants in the grass family Poaceae, native to central Europe and the Balkans.

Taxonomy
It was first described by Wilibald Swibert Joseph Gottlieb von Besser in 1827.

References

Pooideae
Poaceae genera
Plants described in 1827